Flueggea tinctoria is a species of flowering shrub in the family Phyllanthaceae, endemic to the Iberian Peninsula. It is the only species of its genus in Europe.

Description

Branches are erect-patent, spinescent, cylindrical, smooth or warty, glabrous or puberulous and have short, small and thick hairs. Leaves are alternate and glabrous. It has 5 to 8 very exerted stamens.

Distribution and habitat

Flueggea tinctoria is native to the southwest quadrant of the Iberian Peninsula (inland Portugal and centralwestern-southwestern Spain), a good representative of the western Iberian sclerophyllous and semi-deciduous forests. It is especially dominant in the river basins of the Guadalquivir, Guadiana, Tagus and Douro.

References

tinctoria
Flora of Southwestern Europe
Flora of Portugal
Flora of Spain
Endemic flora of the Iberian Peninsula